Linda Jarvis (née Howard) is a female former international table tennis player from England.

Table tennis career
She represented England at four World Table Tennis Championships in the Corbillon Cup (women's team event) from 1973-1981.

She won 12 English National Table Tennis Championships titles.

Personal life
Linda married Nicky Jarvis in 1979 and their son is professional footballer Matt Jarvis. Her sister Susan Howard was also an English international.

See also
 List of England players at the World Team Table Tennis Championships

References

English female table tennis players
Living people
Year of birth missing (living people)